The 2021 Northeast Conference men's basketball tournament was the postseason men's basketball tournament for the Northeast Conference for the 2020–21 NCAA Division I men's basketball season. The tournament took place March 6 and 9, 2021 and all tournament games were played on home arenas of the higher-seeded school. The tournament winner received the automatic bid to the NCAA Tournament.

Seeds
Due to complications caused by the COVID-19 pandemic, only the top four teams in the Northeast Conference were eligible to compete in the conference tournament. Teams were seeded by record within the conference, with a tiebreaker system to seed teams with identical conference records.
Note: Merrimack College joined the Northeast Conference from Division II Northeast-10 Conference in 2019. At the time, the NEC did not allow transitional D-I members to play in the conference tournament, meaning that Warriors would not have been eligible for the NEC Tournament until 2024. After the 2021–22 season, the NEC presidents voted to allow transitional members to compete in the conference tournament starting with their third transitional seasons, making Merrimack eligible for the tournament starting with the 2023 edition.
Note: On February 28, Bryant announced they had canceled their final two regular season games against Mount St. Mary's because of positive COVID-19 results within Bryant's Tier 1 personnel and subsequent contact tracing. Bryant's status for the postseason had initially been uncertain, but they established their intent to compete in the tournament after meeting Rhode Island Department of Health guidelines. Bryant competed in its semifinal game with just seven players, one of whom was a walk-on.

Schedule and results

Bracket and results

See also

2021 Northeast Conference women's basketball tournament

References

Tournament
Northeast Conference men's basketball tournament
Northeast Conference men's basketball tournament